A Universal Interface Language is a language that allows for an interchange of deep information between objects. It does this by allowing an object to experiment on another object to determine what it thinks the object is capable of.

The concept was introduced by Alan Kay as early as 1997 in his keynote speech at OOPSLA.

The goal of a Universal Interface Language is to achieve (automatic) interoperability beyond that provided by an Interface description language such as CORBA or a message exchange protocol such as SOAP.

There are currently no known implementations of a Universal Interface Language. Based on Kay's description, we would expect each object involved in the conversation to have a URL or IP address.

References
Alan Kay: The Computer Revolution Hasn't Happened Yet (Keynote OOPSLA 1997)

Component-based software engineering